Demoticus is a genus of flies in the family Tachinidae.

Species
D. amorphus Villeneuve, 1911
D. plebejus (Fallén, 1810)
D. signatipalpis Richter, 2002

References

Tachininae
Tachinidae genera
Taxa named by Pierre-Justin-Marie Macquart